Ushkov (Russian: Ушков) is a Russian masculine surname, its feminine counterpart is Ushkova. It may refer to:

 Kapiton Ushkov (1813–1868), Russian chemical industrialist
 Konstantin K. Ushkov (1850–1918), Russian industrialist, son of Kapiton
 Konstantin Ushkov (born 1977), Russian swimmer

See also 
 Ushkova house in Kazan, Russia, named after a daughter-in-law of Konstantin K. Ushkov

References 

Russian-language surnames